Lifestyle medicine (LM) is a branch of medicine focused on preventive healthcare and self-care dealing with prevention, research, education, and treatment of disorders caused by lifestyle factors and preventable causes of death such as nutrition, physical inactivity, chronic stress, and self-destructive behaviors including the consumption of tobacco products and drug or alcohol abuse. The goal of LM is to improve individuals' health and wellbeing by applying the 6 pillars of lifestyle medicine (nutrition, regular physical activity, restorative sleep, stress management, avoidance of risky substances, and positive social connection) to prevent chronic conditions such as cardiovascular diseases, diabetes, metabolic syndrome and obesity. By focusing on these 6 areas to improve health, LM can prevent 80% of chronic illnesses and non-communicable diseases (NCD).

Lifestyle medicine focuses on educating and motivating patients to improve the quality of their lives by changing personal habits and behaviors around the use of healthier diets which minimize ultra-processed foods such as a Mediterranean diet or whole food, plant-predominant dietary patterns.  Poor lifestyle choices like dietary patterns, physical inactivity, tobacco use, alcohol addiction and dependence, drug addiction and dependence, as well as psychosocial factors, e.g. chronic stress and lack of social support and community, contribute to chronic disease. In the clinic, major barriers to lifestyle counseling are that physicians feel ill-prepared and are skeptical about their patients' receptivity. However, by encouraging healthy decisions, illnesses can be better managed, reversed, or prevented in the long term.

Characteristics 
Lifestyle Medicine in Practice

The evidence that the body will heal itself when the factors that cause disease are removed is clear. Diseases such as cardiovascular disease and type 2 diabetes that were once thought to be irreversible have been reversed by lifestyle interventions. Lifestyle interventions require behavior changes that may be challenging for health professionals, communities, and patients. The task of the LM practitioner is to motivate and support healthy behavior changes through evidence-based holistic approaches to prevent and reverse chronic conditions. LM emphasizes personalized care and uses patient-center approaches such as goal setting, shared decision making, and self-management. Coaching and supporting people how to cook healthy food at home, for example, can be part of a lifestyle-oriented medical practice. Focusing on the health needs of an individual also includes looking at the person's social and economic needs as well.

LM uses behavioral science to equip and encourage patients to make lifestyle changes. There are many theories of behavior change, the transtheoretical model (TTM) is particularly suited to Lifestyle Medicine. It posits that individuals progress through six stages of change: precontemplation, contemplation, preparation, action, maintenance, and termination. Stage-matched interventions are most likely to result in successful behavior changes.  LM practitioners are encouraged to adopt counseling methods such as motivational interviewing (MI) to identify patient readiness to change and provide stage appropriate lifestyle interventions. These skills have shown to be more effective than giving advice like "exercise more and eat healthy". LM provide the tools and resources to empower people to manage their own physical health and mental care and give them the confidence to live a healthy life.

Levels of Lifestyle Medicine

LM may be practiced on three levels. The first level involves recognition by all health care professionals that lifestyle choices determine health status and is an important modifier of the response to pharmaceutical or surgical treatments. All practitioners are encouraged to include lifestyle advice along with standard treatment protocols.  The second level is specialty care (e.g. Exercise medicine, Physiatry) where LM interventions are the focus of treatment and pharmaceutical or surgical treatments are an adjunct to be used as necessary. The third level is population/community health programs and policies. Lifestyle intervention advice should be included in public health/preventive medicine guidance and policies for the prevention and treatment of chronic diseases.

Interprofessional Education/Collaboration in Lifestyle Medicine Practice

Healthcare professionals and their future patients would benefit if the basics of Lifestyle Medicine were incorporated into all professional training programs. Formal training and personal experience of evidence-based lifestyle interventions such as plant-based nutrition, stress management, physical activity, sleep management, relationship skills and substance abuse mitigation would transform our healthcare system. LM is uniquely suited to interprofessional education where students from two or more health care professions learn together during all or part of their professional training with the objective of cultivating collaborative practice for providing patient-centered care. Physicians and other healthcare providers should feel comfortable talking with their patient about behavioral lifestyle changes and assessing needs in determinants of health. Engaging patients in these conversations can better help them achieve their goals of maintain a healthy lifestyle.

There are many educational pathways to becoming an expert in Lifestyle Medicine. Health professionals can become certified or accredited from the International Board of Lifestyle Medicine (IBLM), American Board of Lifestyle Medicine (ABLM), and British Society of Lifestyle Medicine (BSLM). The Lifestyle Medicine Global Alliance (LMGA) is an organization that connects LM professionals from nations around the world to collaborate, share resources, and create solutions to preventing and reversing non-communicable and chronic diseases.

See also 
 Active living
 Behavior change method
 Behavior change (public health)
 Behavioural change theories
 Community reinforcement approach and family training (CRAFT)
 Health promotion
 Lebensreform
 Preventive Medicine
 Public health
 Recovery model
 Smoking cessation
 Social and behavior change communication (SBCC)
 Straight edge
 Teetotalism
 Temperance movement
 Tobacco harm reduction

References

External links 

Health education
Health promotion
Lifestyle
Practice of medicine
Preventive medicine
Public health education
Public health research
Self-care